The 1970–71 Northern Football League season was the 74th in the history of Northern Football League, a football competition in England.

Clubs

Division One featured 18 clubs which competed in the league last season, along with two new clubs:
 Ashington, joined from the Northern Football Alliance
 Consett, joined from the Wearside Football League

League table

References

External links
 Northern Football League official site

Northern Football League seasons
1970–71 in English football leagues